Sam Bass (July 21, 1851 ‒ July 21, 1878) was a 19th-century American train robber, outlaw, and outlaw gang leader.  Notably, he was a member of a gang of six that robbed a Union Pacific train in Nebraska of $60,000 in newly minted gold from San Francisco, California. To date, this was the biggest train robbery ever committed in the USA. He died as a result of wounds sustained in a gun battle with law enforcement officers.

Early life
Sam Bass was born in Mitchell, Indiana, on July 21, 1851; the son of Daniel and Elizabeth Jane (Sheeks) Bass. His father was a member of the mixed-race Bass family of North Carolina. He was orphaned before his thirteenth birthday, and afterward raised by an uncle. Bass left home at age 19.

Bass worked for about a year at a sawmill in Rosedale, Mississippi, but eventually drifted west to north Texas; where he worked for a time for Sheriff Egan of Denton.  He tried his hand at wrangling cattle, but was unfulfilled by the hard work and low pay. Bass eventually bought a horse and raced it, living on the proceeds for some years.  After the horse became too old to race, Bass and a partner, Joel Collins, formed a cattle drive for several ranchers in the San Antonio, Texas area.  In 1876, they drove the cattle to Nebraska, but squandered their (and the ranchers') proceeds by gambling it away in the gold rush town of Deadwood in the Black Hills area.

Life of crime

Now broke, Bass and Collins tried working as freighters, but could not make a living at it, so they formed an outlaw gang preying on stage coaches.  The gang literally struck gold when they robbed the Union Pacific Railroad gold train from San Francisco on September 18, 1877. They intercepted the train at Big Springs, Nebraska. The robbery netted the gang over $60,000 (equivalent to about $ million in 2022), and they split up.

Bass promptly headed back to Texas and formed a new gang responsible for a string of stagecoach robberies.  In 1878, the gang held up two stagecoaches and four trains within 25 miles (40 km) of Dallas. Although the robberies netted them little money, they became the object of a manhunt by Pinkerton National Detective Agency agents and a special company of the Texas Rangers headed by Captain Junius Peak.

A trap is set
Bass was able to elude the Texas Rangers until a member of his gang, Jim Murphy, turned informant. Mr. Murphy's father, who was very ill at the time, had been taken into custody and held for questioning. He was not allowed to be seen by a doctor and was prevented from receiving medical treatment, which caused his condition to rapidly worsen. Lawmen sent a message to Murphy informing him that they had his father in custody, and that if Murphy did not agree to meet with them, they would continue to withhold medical treatment from the father. Knowing how sick his father was, Murphy agreed to the meeting. There, he reluctantly agreed to turn informant. John B. Jones was subsequently notified of Bass's movements and set up an ambush at Round Rock, Texas, where Bass and the gang planned to rob the Williamson County Bank.

Final shootout
On July 19, 1878, Bass and his gang were scouting the area before the robbery. When they bought some tobacco at a store, they were noticed by Williamson County Deputy Sheriff A. W. Grimes.  When Grimes approached the men to request that they surrender their sidearms, he was shot and killed. A gunfight ensued.  As Bass attempted to flee, he was shot by Texas Rangers agents George Herold and Sergeant Richard Ware. Soapy Smith and his cousin, Edwin, witnessed Ware's shot. Soapy exclaimed, "I think you got him!" No one residing in Round Rock, and none of the visiting Texas Rangers (except Jim Murphy), knew what any of the Bass gang looked like. In fact, after Seaborne Barnes was killed and lay in the street, Ware had to have Murphy identify the body, as no one else knew who the man was. Ware himself stated that he had seen the same three men earlier in town crossing the street to enter the dry goods store, but in fact did not recognize them as the Bass gang.

Death

Bass was later found lying in a pasture west of Round Rock by Williamson County Deputy James Milton Tucker. More specifically, Bass had to call out to the posse as they were about to ride by him, shouting, "Hey I'm over here. I'm Sam Bass, the one you are looking for." He was taken into custody and died the next day on July 21, 1878, his 27th birthday. No photograph was taken of Bass either while he was dying in town under a doctor's care or after he died, even though the Texas Rangers were under tremendous pressure from Austin politicians to capture or kill him. To this day no known photo has ever been confirmed to be of Bass, and when his sister visited Round Rock a year after his death to place a better headstone, she indicated that the photo on the wanted poster shown to her by the Williamson County Sheriff was not of her brother. Bass was buried in Round Rock in what is now known as Round Rock Cemetery. His grave is now marked with a replacement headstone—as the original suffered at the hands of souvenir collectors over the years. What remains of the original stone is on display at the Round Rock Public Library.

Legacy
There are roads named after Bass in Round Rock, Texas, Denton, Texas and west of Sanger, Texas.  During Round Rock's annual Frontier Days celebration, performers re-enact the shootout in the old downtown.

Rosston, Texas celebrates Sam Bass Day annually on the third Saturday in July.

Dramatic representations
Bass has since been portrayed in several books, radio programs, television shows, and movies.
 In a 1936 episode on the syndicated radio drama Death Valley Days, Bass's last days are portrayed.
1957 Tales of Wells Fargo Season 1 Episode 10; Main Character Jim Hardie is ordered to infiltrate Sam Bass' gang so that he can learn where they hole up between raids.
A Lone Ranger episode about Sam Bass was broadcast on April 24, 1944, taking great liberties with the facts.
In 1959, Alan Hale Jr. played Bass in the episode "The Saga of Sam Bass", on the ABC/Warner Bros. western television series Colt .45.
The 2015 Western movie Kill or Be Killed was loosely inspired by outlaw Sam Bass and his gang.
In a 1951 Western movie "The Texas Rangers" starring George Montgomery and Gale Storm.

References

External links
The Story of Sam Bass; Round Rock, Texas Historic Preservation Society
Life and Adventures of Sam Bass, The Notorious Union Pacific and Texas Train Robber: Together with A Graphic Account of His Capture and Death, published 1878.

The City of Allen's Video - The Great Allen Train Robbery- Story about the infamous first train robbery in Texas.

1851 births
1878 deaths
American folklore
Outlaws of the American Old West
People from Mitchell, Indiana
People from Denton, Texas